Arricau-Bordes is a commune in the Pyrénées-Atlantiques department in the Nouvelle-Aquitaine region of south-western France.

Geography

Arricau-Bordes is located some 12 km north-west of Maubourguet and some 40 km north-east of Pau. Access to the commune is by the D13 road from Cadillon in the north passing through the heart of the commune and through the village then continuing south to Lembeye. The D298 from Aurions-Idernes forms the entire eastern border of the commune as it goes south to join the D13 north of Lembaye. The D228 comes from Séméacq-Blachon in the east and passes through the south of the commune west to Gayon. About 60% of the commune is forested mostly in a north–south belt through the centre with the rest of the commune farmland.

The Lisau river flows through the heart of the commune from the Lac de Castillon just over the southern border to the Lac de Cadillon just over the northern border of the commune.

Places and Hamlets

 Arricau
 Les Balances
 Barbé
 Bordes
 Le Calvaire
 Carboué
 Castagnat
 Cazenave
 Cerisère
 Domengé
 Hauzoué
 Lahitole
 Laramoune
 Lecher
 Marchand
 Mereït
 Pédéjouan
 Péhat
 La Riberette
 Séglères
 Tisné
 Val Pré

Neighbouring communes and villages

Toponymy
The commune name in béarnais is Arricau-Bordas.

According to Michel Grosclaude the name Arricau was formed from two Gascon terms: arric, meaning "ravine" or "Thalweg", and cau, meaning "sunken".

Bordes comes from the Occitan borda meaning "house" or "Farm".<ref name="Jobbé">Brigitte Jobbé-Duval, Dictionary of place names - Pyrénées-Atlantiques, 2009, Archives and Culture,  </ref>

The following table details the origins of the commune name and other names in the commune.

Sources:
Raymond: Topographic Dictionary of the Department of Basses-Pyrenees, 1863, on the page numbers indicated in the table. 

Origins:
Marca: Pierre de Marca, History of Béarn''.
Census: Census of Béarn
Reformation: Reformation of Béarn
Lescar: Cartulary of Lescar

History
Paul Raymond noted that, in 1385, Arricau and Bordes depended on the bailiwick of Lembeye and had respectively 18 and 12 fires. Arricau then had two parishes: Saint-Martin and Saint-Jacques. The fief of Bordes depended on the Viscounts of Béarn.

Arricau and Bordes were merged between 1861 and 1866.

Administration

List of Successive Mayors

Inter-communality
The commune is part of four inter-communal structures:
 the Communauté de communes du Nord-Est Béarn;
 the AEP association of Pays de Lembeye;
 the Energy association of Pyrénées-Atlantiques;
 the irrigation association of the Lees valley;

Demography
In 2017 the commune had 108 inhabitants. The population data given in the table and graph below for 1861 and earlier refer to the former commune of Arricau.

Economy
The commune is part of the Appellation d'origine contrôlée (AOC) zones of Madiran, Pacherenc-du-vic-bilh, and Béarn.

Culture and Heritage

Civil heritage

The commune has many sites that are registered as historical monuments:
The Chateau of Arricau (1572) The Chateau contains several items that are registered as historical objects:
An Iron Host (17th century)
A Stoup (18th century)
An Hilarri (16th century)
The Chateau of Bordes at Bordes (18th century)
A House at Lahitole (1777)
Houses and Farms Of the 40 buildings studied, 27 dated from before 1871.

Religious heritage
The commune has two churches that are registered as historical monuments:
The Parish Church of Saint-Jacques at Arricau (1570) was mentioned in 1570 but was destroyed two centuries later.
The Parish Church of Saint John the Baptist at Bordes (11th century) The Church contains several items that are registered as historical objects:
Chasuble (19th century)
2 Processional Lanterns (19th century)
A Processional Cross (17th century)
A Celebrant's Chair (18th century)
An Altar, Altar step, and Tabernacle (18th century)

See also
Communes of the Pyrénées-Atlantiques department

References

External links
Arricau-Bordes on Géoportail, National Geographic Institute (IGN) website 
Saint Martin d'Arricau, Saint Jacques d'Arricau, and Bordes on the 1750 Cassini Map

Communes of Pyrénées-Atlantiques